The Fremont Mill Bridge near Anamosa, Iowa was built in 1873. Its superstructure was designed and built by Massillon Iron Bridge Company and its foundations were built by James Milne. It is a wrought iron bowstring through arch bridge.

It originally spanned the Maquoketa River in Monticello City and was built to replace a bridge that had been destroyed by ice flow.

The bridge has been moved twice, first in 1930 to span Buffalo Creek, and again in 1986.

The Fremont Mill Bridge was listed on the National Register of Historic Places in 1998.

See also
List of bridges documented by the Historic American Engineering Record in Iowa

References

External links

Road bridges on the National Register of Historic Places in Iowa
Bridges completed in 1873
Bridges in Jones County, Iowa
Relocated buildings and structures in Iowa
Historic American Engineering Record in Iowa
National Register of Historic Places in Jones County, Iowa
Truss bridges in Iowa
Wrought iron bridges in the United States
Bowstring truss bridges in the United States
Through arch bridges in the United States